The Ongi River flows from the southeastern slopes of the Khangai Mountains in Övörkhangai Province for  through the endorheic Ongi River Basin in Mongolia and through the aimag capital Arvaikheer. In some particularly wet years, it used to empty into Ulaan Lake in north central Ömnögovi Province, in most years it dries up earlier. In recent years it has been additionally threatened by 37 mining operations within the basin, but successful pressure by Tsetsgeegiin Mönkhbayar and the Ongi River Basin Movement helped convince 35 of the operations to cease explorations and harmful activities in the region. The water and groundwater in this area may be contaminated with mercury and cyanide from the mining industry.

See also
 List of rivers of Mongolia

References

Rivers of Mongolia